Nyamdondovyn Ganbold (born 5 March 1973) is a Mongolian speed skater. He competed in two events at the 1992 Winter Olympics.

References

1973 births
Living people
Mongolian male speed skaters
Olympic speed skaters of Mongolia
Speed skaters at the 1992 Winter Olympics
Sportspeople from Ulaanbaatar
Speed skaters at the 1996 Asian Winter Games
Speed skaters at the 1999 Asian Winter Games
20th-century Mongolian people